Garicola koreensis is a Gram-positive, aerobic, non-endospore-forming, moderately halophilic and non-motile species of bacteria from the family Micrococcaceae which has been isolated from Saeu-jeot in Korea.

References

Micrococcaceae
Bacteria genera
Monotypic bacteria genera